Brestje is a settlement east of Kojsko in the Municipality of Brda in the Littoral region of Slovenia.

References

External links
Brestje on Geopedia

Populated places in the Municipality of Brda